In baseball, a batboy or batgirl  is an individual who carries baseball bats to the players on a baseball team. Duties of a batboy may also include handling and preparing players’ equipment and bringing baseballs to the umpire during the game. During games, a batboy remains in or near a team's dugout and the area around home plate.

A batboy should not be confused with ball boys, who are stationed down the foul lines to retrieve foul balls. As batboys are stationed on the field, albeit in foul territory, they can occasionally interfere with play; such events are governed by Rule 6.01(d), the main point of which is that if the interference is unintentional, any live ball remains alive and in play.

History

Mascots and batboys had both been part of baseball since the 1880s. Perhaps the most famous mascot/batboy was Eddie Bennett, who was supposedly hired as a mascot by the Chicago White Sox at the urging of Happy Felsch in 1919, a tale Eddie told often but no White Sox player ever corroborated. After the 1919 World Series scandal, he was hired by the Brooklyn Dodgers in 1920. When the Dodgers lost the 1920 World Series to the Cleveland Indians, some suggested the four straight losses on the road were due to leaving Bennett behind. He then served for almost 12 years as mascot/batboy for the New York Yankees.

The younger Griffith became the principal owner of the franchise upon the death of the elder Griffith in 1955, and orchestrated the relocation of the franchise after the 1960 season; the team has competed as the Minnesota Twins since 1961.

Uniforms

Batboys typically wear the same uniform design as their associated team. They will also usually wear a batting helmet to protect them from flying balls or bats.

During any given major league game, both the home and visiting team batboys will be drawn from the city where the game is taking place (batboys typically do not travel on the road with their team, unless they are relatives of a player). Home batboys often have regular jobs with a team, and thus may wear their first names on their uniforms; visiting teams, on the other hand, usually do not know who will be serving as their batboys on the road, and thus will send uniforms of various sizes to accommodate batboys of varying heights and weights.

A batboy may be provided his own number, but will usually wear 00 or 'BB' in its place. If a batboy uniform does not have a first name on it, it will usually have the term 'BAT BOY' or no name at all.

In the news

In the 2002 World Series, a batboy (Darren Baker, the 3½ year old son of San Francisco Giants manager Dusty Baker) was involved in an incident when he went out to get a bat while play was still in progress. J. T. Snow, while in the act of scoring a run for the Giants, grabbed the young boy at home plate, avoiding the batboy possibly being involved in a collision with other baserunners or players from the opposing team. After the incident, MLB set a minimum age of 14 for batboys.
Matthew McGough described his batboy experiences with the New York Yankees in Bat Boy: My True-Life Adventures Coming of Age with the New York Yankees, a book published by Doubleday in 2005. McGough's book served as the basis for Clubhouse, a prime-time television show that aired on CBS in the fall of 2004.
On April 27, 2007, former New York Mets batboy (1985–1995) Kirk Radomski pleaded guilty in United States district court to money laundering and illegal distribution of anabolic steroids, human growth hormone, Clenbuterol, amphetamines and other drugs to "dozens of current and former Major League Baseball players, and associates, on teams throughout Major League Baseball." He faced a maximum sentence of 25 years in prison and a $500,000 fine, but he was sentenced to 5 years probation and ordered to pay a fine of $18,575 due to his cooperation with the federal government and the Mitchell Report.
In a pregame ceremony on May 5, 2007, Stan Bronson Jr. received recognition by Guinness World Records as the "Most Durable Batboy" ever. Bronson, known as "Stan The Man", had served as the batboy for the University of Memphis baseball team since the 1958 season. His 50 years of service was recognized in the 2008 edition of the Guinness book.
Dominick Ardovino wrote about his batboy experience with the New York Mets in The Bat Boy (New York: McGraw-Hill, 1967).

Batboys who became MLB players
Examples of batboys who went on to play in Major League Baseball include Drew Storen, who served as a batboy for the Montreal Expos when the team visited Cincinnati, and Jesse Litsch, who was a batboy for the Tampa Bay Devil Rays in 2001 and 2002.

In popular culture
The batboy, Bobby Savoy, is a supporting character in the 1984 film, The Natural. At the finale, Bobby gives the main character, Roy Hobbs, a bat that he's made with Hobbs' help after Hobbs has broken his own personally made childhood bat.

Two Warner Brothers cartoons, Porky's Baseball Broadcast and Baseball Bugs, feature sight-gags involving batboys who fly in on bat wings to deliver bats.

See also

Water boy

References

External links
"A Boy and His Job.”  1969-06-04. Elliott Ashley, bat boy for the New York Yankees, explains his duties in this documentary produced by National Educational Television, preserved in the American Archive of Public Broadcasting.
Morris, Peter Eddie Bennett via baseball biography project
Excerpt from Matthew McGough's book Bat Boy (Part 1)
Excerpt from Matthew McGough's book Bat Boy (Part 2)
Grossfeld, Stan (April 27, 2005). Batboy finds it tough to pick up his life. Boston Globe
ESPN (August 25, 2005). Suspended batboy mulling two offers.

Baseball occupations
Baseball terminology
Baseball bats